Jennifer Sterling is a Jamaican former cricketer who played as a slow left-arm orthodox bowler and left-handed batter. She seven One Day Internationals for the West Indies, all at the 1993 World Cup. She played domestic cricket for Jamaica.

Sterling appeared in all seven of her team's matches at the World Cup, an accomplishment shared by only three of her teammates. She scored 72 runs in total, the fourth-most for her team, behind Ann Browne, Carol-Ann James, and Eve Caesar. Her best batting performance came in the final match of the tournament, when she scored 26 from 72 balls against Ireland. As a bowler, Sterling took three wickets, and was called upon to bowl in all but one game (against New Zealand).  Her best figures came in the match against Denmark, where she took 2/19 from 9.1 overs.

References

External links
 
 

Living people
Date of birth missing (living people)
Year of birth missing (living people)
West Indian women cricketers
West Indies women One Day International cricketers
Jamaican women cricketers